Niles Nelson (born c. 1938) is an American football coach.  He served as the head football coach at Husson University from 2009 to 2010. He became the program's second head coach in 2009 after the surprising resignation by Jonathan "Gabby" Price, the first head coach who had served since 2003.

Nelson earned his Ph.D. in Physical Education at Florida State University, where he also served as a graduate assistant coach for the Seminoles football team. He has coached at both the high school and collegiate levels, with stops including Rhode Island, Methodist, The Citadel and Nichols.

Head coaching record

College

References

Year of birth missing (living people)
1930s births
Living people
Florida State Seminoles football coaches
Husson Eagles football coaches
Nichols Bison football coaches
Methodist Monarchs football coaches
Rhode Island Rams football coaches
The Citadel Bulldogs football coaches
High school football coaches in Maine
Florida State University alumni